Catognatha gracilis is a species of beetle in the family Cerambycidae, and the only species in the genus Catognatha. It was described by Blanchard in 1851.

References

Desmiphorini
Beetles described in 1851
Monotypic Cerambycidae genera